Claire McCusker Murray (born April 19, 1982) is an American lawyer who served as associate White House counsel and acting associate attorney general in the United States Department of Justice during the Presidency of Donald Trump. She served in this position from May 14, 2019  until Joe Biden assumed the presidency on January 20, 2021. She is a member of the United States Sentencing Commission.

Early life and education
Raised in Mountain Lakes, New Jersey, by Leo and Susan McCusker, she graduated from Mountain Lakes High School as the valedictorian and a Presidential Scholar in 2000. She was inducted into the school's hall of fame in 2016.

Murray graduated from Harvard College with a  Bachelor of Arts in government magna cum laude and Phi Beta Kappa on an Augustus Clifford Tower Fellowship in 2004, then went to France for a Diploma of Advanced Studies in political studies from the School for Advanced Studies in the Social Sciences in 2005, and to the United Kingdom for a Master of Philosophy in classics from Trinity College, Cambridge, in 2006 (each with distinction). She went on to earn her Juris Doctor in 2009 from Yale Law School, where she was a member of the board of the Federalist Society, a Coker Fellow and was an articles editor of the Yale Law Journal.

After graduating law school, she served as a law clerk for then-Judge Brett Kavanaugh on the United States Court of Appeals for the District of Columbia Circuit from 2009 to 2010, then for Associate Justice Samuel Alito on the United States Supreme Court from 2012 to 2013. In 2010, between her appellate clerkship and starting at the Justice Department, she won a Temple Bar Scholarship from the American Inns of Court to examine the legal system in the United Kingdom, including the Supreme Court of the United Kingdom.

Career
After returning to the United States, she worked for the U.S. Department of Justice in the Criminal Division from 2010 to 2012.

She worked as an associate (2013–2015) and then partner (2015–2017) at Kirkland & Ellis LLP.

As associate counsel for the White House, Murray played a role in the successful confirmation of Brett Kavanaugh to the Supreme Court, for whom she had clerked while he was on the circuit court. After William Barr became United States Attorney General in February 2019, she became a counselor to the attorney general and then the principal deputy associate attorney general in May 2019, in which capacity she served as acting associate attorney general pending the confirmation of a permanent associate attorney general.

In 2020, U.S. President Donald Trump seriously considered nominating her to the United States Court of Appeals for the District of Columbia Circuit, but nominated Justin R. Walker instead.

Nomination to United States Sentencing Commission 

On May 11, 2022, President Joe Biden announced his intent to nominate Murray to serve as a member of the United States Sentencing Commission. On May 12, 2022, her nomination was sent to the Senate, she has been nominated to fill the position left vacant by Judge Danny C. Reeves, whose term expired. On June 8, 2022, a hearing on her nomination was held before the Senate Judiciary Committee. On July 21, 2022, her nomination was reported out of committee by a voice vote, with Senators Sheldon Whitehouse, Richard Blumenthal, and Jon Ossoff voting “no” on record. On August 4, 2022, the United States Senate confirmed her nomination by a voice vote.

Personal life
In 2010, she married Michael Murray, with whom she has four children.

See also 
List of law clerks of the Supreme Court of the United States (Seat 8)

References

External links

1982 births
Living people
21st-century American women lawyers
21st-century American lawyers
Alumni of Trinity College, Cambridge
Harvard College alumni
People associated with Kirkland & Ellis
Law clerks of the Supreme Court of the United States
Members of the United States Sentencing Commission
Mountain Lakes High School alumni
People from Mountain Lakes, New Jersey
School for Advanced Studies in the Social Sciences alumni
Trump administration personnel
United States Associate Attorneys General
Yale Law School alumni